Marco André da Silva Lopes Matias (born 10 May 1989) is a Portuguese professional footballer who plays for S.C. Farense as a forward.

Club career

Portugal
Born in Barreiro, Setúbal District, Matias finished his youth career at Sporting CP. He never represented the first team officially as a senior, being consecutively loaned to Varzim SC, C.D. Fátima and Real SC, with all the clubs but the third competing in the Segunda Liga.

Matias signed with Vitória S.C. in the summer of 2010, being immediately loaned to S.C. Freamunde of the second division for two years. He subsequently returned to Guimarães, making his debut in the Primeira Liga on 19 August 2012 by coming on as a 62nd-minute substitute in a 0–0 home draw against Sporting, and finished his first season with 20 scoreless appearances.

Matias scored his first goal in the Portuguese top flight on 31 August 2013, but in a 1–4 home loss to Vitória de Setúbal. On 19 July 2014 he joined fellow league side C.D. Nacional, netting 21 times from 42 competitive games to help the Madeirans to the seventh position.

Sheffield Wednesday
In July 2015, Matias signed a four-year deal with Championship club Sheffield Wednesday. His first goal came in his fourth league appearance on 22 August, the 1–1 draw against Leeds United – a volley from 18 yards that flew in off the underside of the bar.

Matias was released at the end of the 2018–19 season. His spell at the Hillsborough Stadium was bothered by several injury problems.

Return to Nacional
On 26 January 2021, Matias returned to Portugal and Nacional on a five-month contract.

International career
Matias won five caps for the Portugal under-21 team. His first came on 11 July 2009, as he played the full 90 minutes in a 1–0 loss against Cape Verde in the Lusofonia Games.

Honours
Vitória Guimarães
Taça de Portugal: 2012–13

References

External links

1989 births
Living people
Sportspeople from Barreiro, Portugal
Portuguese footballers
Association football forwards
Primeira Liga players
Liga Portugal 2 players
Segunda Divisão players
F.C. Barreirense players
Sporting CP footballers
Varzim S.C. players
C.D. Fátima players
Real S.C. players
Vitória S.C. players
S.C. Freamunde players
Vitória S.C. B players
C.D. Nacional players
Belenenses SAD players
S.C. Farense players
English Football League players
Sheffield Wednesday F.C. players
Portugal youth international footballers
Portugal under-21 international footballers
Portuguese expatriate footballers
Expatriate footballers in England
Portuguese expatriate sportspeople in England